Gwangju usually refers to Gwangju Metropolitan City in South Korea:

It may also refer to:
 Gwangju, Gyeonggi, a small city in Gyeonggi-do, South Korea
 Guangzhou, China, in Korean contexts

See also
 Guangzhou (disambiguation), its Chinese equivalent